Elizabeth Lyon Beisel (born August 18, 1992) is an American competition swimmer who specializes in backstroke and individual medley events. Beisel placed second in the 400m individual medley at the 2016 US Olympic Swimming Trials, qualifying for her third Olympic team. She has won a total of nine medals in major international competition, four gold, one silver, and four bronze spanning the Olympics, World Aquatics, and the Pan Pacific championships. Beisel competed in the 200-meter backstroke and 400-meter individual medley events at the 2008 Summer Olympics, placing fifth and fourth, respectively, in the world. She won the silver medal in the 400-meter individual medley and bronze in the 200-meter backstroke at the 2012 Summer Olympics.

On September 25, 2021, she became the first woman to ever swim to Block Island. The 20 km swim raised funds for cancer research and clinical trials.

In August 2020, SPIRE Institute and Academy signed Biesel to become a swimming ambassador. She will be joining Caeleb Dressel in representing the school. The goal of the partnership with SPIRE and the ambassadors is to emphasize the development of peak performance in athletics, academics, character and life.

Early life
Beisel was born in Saunderstown, Rhode Island, in 1992, the daughter of Ted and Joan Beisel. She graduated from North Kingstown High School in North Kingstown, Rhode Island in 2010. From the age of 12 through high school, she competed for the Bluefish Swim Club while training under coach Chuck Batchelor. Beisel became a member of the U.S. national swim team when she was 13 years old.
Beisel's great uncle, Warren William Krech, has a star on the Hollywood Walk of Fame and was called the "King of Pre-code Hollywood." He was also one of the original fourteen members of the Screen Actors Guild.

College career
Beisel accepted an athletic scholarship to attend the University of Florida in Gainesville, Florida, where she swam for coach Gregg Troy's Florida Gators swimming and diving team in National Collegiate Athletic Association (NCAA) competition from 2011 to 2014. She won nine Southeastern Conference (SEC) individual championships, and was honored as the SEC Female Swimmer of the Year in 2012. Beisel also won the NCAA individual championships in the 200-yard backstroke in 2012, and the 400-yard individual medley in 2013, leading the Lady Gators to a seventh, tenth, sixth and sixth-place team finishes at the NCAA national championships. She received eighteen All-American honors and earned first-team Academic All-America recognition.

International career

2007 World Championships
At the age of 14, Beisel competed in the 2007 World Championships. She advanced to the semi-finals and placed twelfth overall in the 200-meter backstroke.

2008 Summer Olympics

At the 2008 U.S. Olympic Trials, Beisel finished second to Katie Hoff in the 400-meter individual medley with a time of 4:32.87. Hoff went on to set the world record in that race. In the 200-meter backstroke, Beisel finished second to Margaret Hoelzer, who also set the world record.

As a 15-year-old, Beisel was the youngest member of the U.S. Olympic swim team at the 2008 Summer Olympics in Beijing, China. Beisel clocked the best time in the preliminaries of the 400-meter individual medley, and finished fourth in the final with a time of 4:34.24. She had the second fastest time in the semi-finals of the 200-meter backstroke, and finished fifth in the final.

2009 World Championships

At the 2009 National Championships, Beisel competed in four individual events and qualified to swim in two finals. In the 400-meter individual medley, Beisel edged Julia Smit with a time of 4:36.31. In the 200-meter backstroke, Beisel finished first with a time of 2:08.80. Margaret Hoelzer, the Olympic silver medalist in Beijing, finished third.

In her first event at the 2009 World Aquatics Championships, the 200-meter backstroke, Beisel finished third in the final with a time of 2:06.39, just missing Hoelzer's American record of 2:06.09. In the 400-meter individual medley final, Beisel placed fifth.

2010 Pan Pacific Championships
At the 2010 National Championships, Beisel competed in two events. In the 400-meter individual medley, the defending national champion slipped to fourth place. In the 200-meter backstroke, Beisel successfully defended her national title, finishing first with a time of 2:08.50.

At the 2010 Pan Pacific Swimming Championships, Beisel won two gold medals. Her first gold medal came in the 400-meter individual medley, in which she finished first with a time of 4:34.69. It was three seconds faster than the second-place finisher and was Beisel's first international gold medal. In the 200-meter backstroke, Beisel won her second gold medal with a time of 2:07.83.

2011 World Aquatics Championships

At the 2011 World Aquatics Championships in Shanghai, China, Beisel competed in two events, the 200-meter backstroke and the 400-meter individual medley. After qualifying third in both the heats (2:08.40) and semi-finals (2:07.82) of the 200-meter backstroke, Beisel finished in fifth place in the final with a time of 2:08.16. In her second and final event the 400-meter individual medley, Beisel won the gold in a time of 4:31.78. In the heats, Beisel posted the top qualifying time with a 4:34.95. Her nearest competitor, Hannah Miley, was over two seconds behind. This was Beisel's first individual title at a World Aquatics Championships.

2012 Summer Olympics

At the 2012 U.S. Olympic Trials in Omaha, Nebraska, Beisel qualified for the U.S. Olympic team by placing first in the women's 400-meter individual medley. In the final, Beisel posted a personal best time of 4:31.74, finishing more than two seconds ahead of teammate Caitlin Leverenz. She also qualified in the 200-meter backstroke by placing second, behind Missy Franklin, with a time of 2:07.58. In her third event, the 400-meter freestyle, Beisel placed fifth in a time of 4:07.29.

At the 2012 Summer Olympics in London, Beisel posted a time of 4:31.68 in the preliminaries of the 400-meter individual medley. She was seeded first going into the finals, and received a silver medal for finishing second behind China's Ye Shiwen with a time of 4:31.27 to Ye's 4:28.46. She also won a bronze medal by placing third in the 200-meter backstroke with a time of 2:06.55, behind American Missy Franklin and Russian Anastasia Zuyeva.

2016 Summer Olympics

At the 2016 U.S. Olympic Trials held in Omaha, Nebraska, Beisel qualified for her 3rd Olympic team in the women's 400-meter individual medley. In the finals, Beisel swam a 4:36.81 for 2nd place behind Maya Dirado, who won the event with a 4:33.73.

In Rio de Janeiro, Beisel finished sixth in the final of the 400-meter individual medley with a time of 4:34.98.

2020 coaching career 
In August 2020, SPIRE Institute and Academy signed Biesel to become a swimming ambassador. As an ambassador she will lead and instruct select classes.

Personal bests (long course)
.

Involvement in LEAD Sports Summit 
Since retiring from her swimming career, Elizabeth has become extremely involved in the LEAD Sports Summit. She has been a part of this organization since 2017 and is currently active. LEAD is a yearly summit that connects young female athletes with Olympic champions and experts through an all-inclusive, 4-day event.

See also

 List of Olympic medalists in swimming (women)
 List of University of Florida alumni
 List of University of Florida Olympians
 List of World Aquatics Championships medalists in swimming (women)

Bibliography
 Beisel, Elizabeth with Beth Fehr. Silver Lining. United States, Nico 11 Publishing & Design, January 22, 2020. .

References

External links
 
 
 
 
 
 

1992 births
Living people
American female backstroke swimmers
American female medley swimmers
Florida Gators women's swimmers
Medalists at the 2012 Summer Olympics
Olympic bronze medalists for the United States in swimming
Olympic silver medalists for the United States in swimming
People from North Kingstown, Rhode Island
Sportspeople from Washington County, Rhode Island
Survivor (American TV series) contestants
Swimmers at the 2008 Summer Olympics
Swimmers at the 2012 Summer Olympics
Swimmers at the 2016 Summer Olympics
World Aquatics Championships medalists in swimming
21st-century American women